László Detre (October 29, 1874, Nagysurány  – May 7, 1939, Washington, DC (a.k.a. Ladislas Deutsch, Ladislaus Deutsch) was a Hungarian physician and microbiologist, the founder and first director of the Hungarian Serum Institute in Budapest. 

Detre coined the term "antigen" in a 1903 French-language paper co-authored with Russian biologist Élie Metchnikoff (referring to "substances immunogènes ou antigènes"), although the word and concept appears in his research as early as 1899. He is also a codiscoverer of the Wassermann reaction, publishing his discovery in humans just two weeks after Wassermann documented his findings in apes.

References

Hungarian microbiologists
1874 births
1939 deaths
Hungarian emigrants to the United States